Below is a list of municipalities in Germany with over 20,000 inhabitants in the year 2000. The list is sorted by population and gives the state of every municipality. In cases where the municipality's name in German differs from its name in English, the English name is listed first with the German name given in parentheses.

In German, the term Mittelstadt (literally "middle [sized] city") is used for a settlement with 20,000 to 99,999 inhabitants, while a settlement of 100,000 or more is called a Großstadt (literally "big city", but usually translated "city"). Population is counted either in terms of a continuous urban area or by municipal boundaries. If going by municipal borders, that also makes this a list of Groß- and Mittelstädte.

Großstädte

Mittelstädte

See also 
 List of cities in Germany by population
 List of the most populated municipalities in the Nordic countries

External links 
 Statistisches Bundesamt - Gemeindeverzeichnis 
 Germany by Map: All cities and communes

Germany

Municipalities